Neornithischia ("new ornithischians") is a clade of the dinosaur order Ornithischia.  It is the sister group of the Thyreophora within the clade Genasauria. Neornithischians are united by having a thicker layer of asymmetrical enamel on the inside of their lower teeth. The teeth wore unevenly with chewing and developed sharp ridges that allowed neornithischians to break down tougher plant food than other dinosaurs. Neornithischians include a variety of basal forms historically known as "hypsilophodonts", including the Parksosauridae; in addition, there are derived forms classified in the groups Marginocephalia and Ornithopoda. The former includes clades Pachycephalosauria and Ceratopsia, while the latter typically includes Hypsilophodon and the more derived Iguanodontia.

Classification
Neornithischia was first named by Cooper in 1985 and defined as "all genasaurians more closely related to Parasaurolophus walkeri than to Ankylosaurus magniventris or Stegosaurus stenops". In 2021, Neornithischia was given a formal definition under the PhyloCode: "The largest clade containing Iguanodon bernissartensis and Triceratops horridus but not Ankylosaurus magniventris and Stegosaurus stenops."

A 2017 study by Matthew G. Baron, David B. Norman, and Paul M. Barrett recovered the Early Jurassic taxon Lesothosaurus diagnosticus from Southern Africa as the most basal known member of Neornithischia – a position previously held by Stormbergia dangershoeki (a taxon considered by the authors to be an adult form of Lesothosaurus and therefore a junior subjective synonym). However, Baron et al. go on to state that this result is only poorly supported and that future studies will be needed in order to better resolve the base of the ornithischian tree.

The below cladogram follows an analysis by Clint A. Boyd published in 2015 on the relationships of neornithischians:

The cladogram below results from analysis by Herne et al., 2019.  Parksosaurus and Elasmaria were recovered within Ornithopoda, among other revised relationships.

References

External links
 Encyclopædia Britannica
 Palæos

 
Bajocian first appearances
Maastrichtian extinctions